Hassenstein is a surname of:

 Bernhard Hassenstein (1922–2016), German biologist and behaviorist.
 Bruno Hassenstein (1839–1902), German cartographer

See also 
 Bohuslav Hasištejnský z Lobkovic (1461-1510),  Czech nobleman, writer and humanist 
 Hasištejn Castle, castle in Bohemian

Surnames